The following lists events that happened during 1965 in New Zealand.

Population
 Estimated population as of 31 December: 2,663,800
 Increase since 31 December 1964: 46,800 (1.79%)
 Males per 100 females: 100.7

Incumbents

Regal and viceregal
Head of State – Elizabeth II
Governor-General – Brigadier Sir Bernard Fergusson GCMG GCVO DSO OBE.

Government
The 34th Parliament of New Zealand continued, with the 2nd National government in power.
Speaker of the House – Ronald Algie.
Prime Minister – Keith Holyoake.
Deputy Prime Minister – Jack Marshall.
Minister of Finance – Harry Lake.
Minister of Foreign Affairs – Keith Holyoake.
Attorney-General – Ralph Hanan.
Chief Justice — Sir Harold Barrowclough

Parliamentary opposition 
 Leader of the Opposition –   Arnold Nordmeyer (Labour) until 16 December, then  Norman Kirk (Labour).

Main centre leaders
Mayor of Auckland – Dove-Myer Robinson then Roy McElroy
Mayor of Hamilton – Denis Rogers
Mayor of Wellington – Frank Kitts
Mayor of Christchurch – George Manning
Mayor of Dunedin – Stuart Sidey then Russell Calvert

Events 
 27 March – A Tasman Empire Airways Limited (TEAL) Lockheed L-188 Electra on a training flight crashes and catches fire on landing at Whenuapai Airport. All occupants escape with only one minor injury.
 1 April – TEAL is renamed Air New Zealand.
 11 April – Qantas launches the first trans-Tasman jet service, between Christchurch and Sydney using Boeing 707 aircraft.
 13 April – An explosion and fire at the General Plastics factory in Masterton kills four people and injures four others.
 April – The HVDC Inter-Island link is completed, connecting the North Island's electricity network and the South Island's electricity network together.
 15 May – Benmore Dam is officially opened by Prime Minister Keith Holyoake.
 27 May – Vietnam War: Prime Minister Keith Holyoake announces New Zealand will send its first combat forces, an artillery battery, to South Vietnam.
 20 July – A 33-hour prison riot breaks out at Mount Eden Prison, Auckland, with inmates setting fire to large parts of the prison.
 31 August – New Zealand Australia Free Trade Agreement signed.
 3 November – Riccarton Mall, the South Island's first indoor shopping mall, opens to shoppers.

Arts and literature
Janet Frame wins the Robert Burns Fellowship.

See 1965 in art, 1965 in literature

Music

New Zealand Music Awards
Loxene Golden Disc Ray Columbus & The Invaders – Till We Kissed

See: 1965 in music

Radio and television
Television in the "four main centres" (Auckland, Wellington, Christchurch and Dunedin) is now broadcast seven nights a week. Broadcasting now totals 50 hours a week.
There are 300,000 television licences. 
28 August – Christchurch's CHTV-3 switches to the new Sugarloaf transmitter in the Port Hills.
The broadcast relay station at Mount Studholme is commissioned, extending television coverage to South Canterbury.
New Zealand Television Workshop awards:
Best Factual: Compass
Best Light Entertainment: In the Groove
Best Children's Series: Junior Magazine with Jasmine

See: 1965 in New Zealand television, 1965 in television, List of TVNZ television programming, :Category:Television in New Zealand, :Category:New Zealand television shows, Public broadcasting in New Zealand

Film

See: :Category:1965 film awards, 1965 in film, List of New Zealand feature films, Cinema of New Zealand, :Category:1965 films

Sport

Athletics
Ray Puckett wins his fifth national title in the men's marathon, clocking 2:24:26.8 on 13 March in Dunedin.

Chess
 The 72nd National Chess Championships are held in Wellington. The winner is J.R. Phillips of Wellington

Horse racing

Harness racing
 New Zealand Trotting Cup – Gary Dillon
 Auckland Trotting Cup – Robin Dundee

Lawn bowls
The national outdoor lawn bowls championships are held in Auckland.
 Men's singles champion – Ron Buchan (Tui Park Bowling Club)
 Men's pair champions – Norm Lash, C.D. McGarry (skip) (Carlton Bowling Club)
 Men's fours champions – J. Miller, G. MacRae, A. Cotton, P. Jones (skip) (Otahuhu Railway Bowling Club)

Soccer
 The Chatham Cup is won by Eastern Suburbs of Auckland who beat Saint Kilda 4–1 in the final.
 Provincial league champions:
	Bay of Plenty:	Rangers
	Buller:	Granity Athletic
	Canterbury:	Christchurch City
	Hawke's Bay:	Napier Rovers
	Manawatu:	Kiwi United
	Marlborough:	Woodbourne
	Nelson:	Rangers
	Otago:	St Kilda
	Poverty Bay:	Eastern Union
	South Canterbury:	West End
	Southland:	Invercargill Thistle
	Taranaki:	Moturoa
	Wairarapa:	Masterton Athletic
	Wanganui:	Wanganui Athletic
	Wellington:	Diamond
	West Coast:	Cobden-Kohinoor
 The Northern League is formed, incorporating top teams from Northland, Auckland, Franklin and Waikato. The first League champions are Eastern Suburbs of Auckland.

Births
10 January: John Radovonich, field hockey player.
 11 February: Eric Rush, rugby union and rugby sevens player.
 14 February: Zinzan Brooke, rugby player.
 15 February: Jamie Smith, field hockey player.
 15 March: Robyn Malcolm actor
 4 April: Gail Jonson, swimmer.
 8 April: Michael Jones, rugby player.
 22 April: Carmel Clark, swimmer.
 28 May (in Britain): Alan Henderson, bobsleigh pilot
 28 June: Duane Mann, rugby league player.
 29 July: Paresh Patel, field hockey player.
 31 August: Willie Watson, cricketer.
 1 September: Tania Roxborogh, writer.
 7 September: Tea Ropati, rugby league player.
 21 September: Belinda Cordwell, tennis player.
 26 October: Ken Rutherford, cricketer.
 24 November: Nyla Carroll, long-distance runner.
 18 December: Anna Doig, freestyle and butterfly swimmer.
 John Leigh, actor.
 Se'e Solomona, rugby league player.
 Hilary Timmins, television presenter.

Deaths
 21 June: Thomas Hislop, Jr., Mayor of Wellington 1931-45 (in Montreal, Canada).
 10 September: John Weeks, painter.
 10 September: Walter Broadfoot, politician.

See also
List of years in New Zealand
Timeline of New Zealand history
History of New Zealand
Military history of New Zealand
Timeline of the New Zealand environment
Timeline of New Zealand's links with Antarctica

References

External links

 
New Zealand
Years of the 20th century in New Zealand